

Canadian Football News in 1927
Western Canada Intercollegiate Union was formed. 

No senior league games played in the Alberta Rugby Football Union for this year.

Regular season

Final regular season standings
Note: GP = Games Played, W = Wins, L = Losses, T = Ties, PF = Points For, PA = Points Against, Pts = Points
*Bold text means that they have clinched the playoffs

League Champions

Grey Cup playoffs
Note: All dates in 1927

MRFU Tie-Breaker

Tammany Tigers advance to the western semi-final

BCRFU final

University of British Columbia Varsity advance to the western final

Western semifinal

Regina Roughriders advance to the western final

Western Finals

Manager Ronne Bohem decided that Regina would not go on to play in the Grey Cup game.

East final

Hamilton advances to the Grey Cup game.

Playoff bracket

Grey Cup Championship

References

 
Canadian Football League seasons